Arne Ludvig Grundt Ileby (2 December 1913 – 25 December 1999) was a Norwegian footballer. He played his entire senior career as a forward for Fredrikstad FK, with which he won four Norwegian Football Cup titles (1935, 1936, 1938, and 1940) and two Norwegian Premier League titles (1937–38 and 1938–39).

Ileby was in the Norwegian squads for the 1936 Olympics and the 1938 World Cup, but was not capped in either tournament. His only appearance for the national team was in a match against Sweden in 1939.

References

External links 
 

1913 births
1999 deaths
Sportspeople from Fredrikstad
Norwegian footballers
Norway international footballers
Fredrikstad FK players
1938 FIFA World Cup players
Association football forwards